Presidential elections were held in Nigeria on 16 April 2011, postponed from 9 April 2011. The election followed controversy as to whether a northerner or southerner should be allowed to become president given the tradition of rotating the top office between the north and the south after the death of Umaru Yar'Adua, a northerner, when Goodluck Jonathan, another southerner assumed the interim presidency.

Immediately after the election widespread violence erupted in the northern, Muslim parts of the country. Jonathan was declared the winner on 19 April. However, international observers declared the election to be "orderly, free and fair" in the entire southern half of the country.

Background

According to a gentlemen's agreement within the ruling Peoples Democratic Party (PDP) power is to rotate between the predominantly Muslim north and Christian south every two terms; this meant the flag bearer of the party for the 2011 election was scheduled to be represented by a Northerner. After the death of one term President Umar Yar'Adua, a Northern Muslim, his Vice President Goodluck Jonathan, a Southern Christian, took over as acting president. The suggestion that Jonathan was considering running for the presidency in his own right was controversial as Yar'Adua had only served one of the two possible terms as president after Southerner Olusegun Obasanjo.

Candidates
Due to the zoning system, a Northern Muslim candidate, Ibrahim Babangida, a former general and military ruler, and Atiku Abubakar, a former vice president, ran for the presidency. After initial doubts, the interim president Goodluck Jonathan declared his intention to run for the presidency on 18 September 2010. Muhammadu Buhari was seen as the principal opposition to Jonathan besides Nuhu Ribadu.

In 2011, sixty-three political parties were registered in Nigeria Online newspaper Naija Gist reported that twenty-one parties were fielding candidates, but listed only 19. Only one woman, Ebiti Ndok, was running.

Campaign
Following a bombing in Abuja during Nigeria's 50th anniversary of Independence celebrations and the arrest and interrogation of the Director General of Babangida campaign, Raymond Dokpesi, there were calls for him to quit the race. In addition, others who linked his affiliates to the blasts. He responded in saying it would be "idiotic to link" him with attack. Even before the blasts, however, some of his former loyalists, popularly called "IBB Boys," apparently asked him to quit the presidential race to avoid being rubbished by a non-General.

Controversy
Postponement
In September 2010, the election commission requested a postponement of the polls citing the need for more time to overhaul the national electoral register. Critics were upset over the proposal. The election was postponed from January to April 2011 due to the release of a new electronic voter registration software.

Pre-election violence
In December 2010, bombs went off in Yenegoa, Bayelsa State during a gubernatorial campaign rally. Politicians and police said that the campaign of violence aimed to disrupt the election.
There had been bombings and shootings in the north blamed on Boko Haram since 2009, intensifying during 2010. On 1 October 2010, the "Movement for the Emancipation of the Niger Delta", a militant group, claimed responsibility for dual car bombings during Nigeria's 50th independence anniversary celebrations in the capital that had killed at least 12. On Christmas Eve, 24 December 2010 a series of bombs went off in villages near Jos, the main city of the Plateau state, killing 32 people and leaving 74 others in critical condition, and on 31 December 2010 a bomb exploded in an open-air beer garden and market at army barracks in Abuja, killing at least four and wounding at least 21.

Results
The elections was reported in the international media as having run smoothly with relatively little violence or voter fraud in contrast to previous elections, in particular the widely disputed 2007 election.  Indeed, at least one observer pronounced them the most smoothly run elections held since the restoration of democracy 12 years earlier.

The United States State Department said the election was "successful" and a "substantial improvement" over 2007, although it added that vote rigging and fraud also took place. The Guardian also noted that irregularities, such as underage voting and snatching of ballot boxes were reported. Buhari claimed that his supporters in the south were not allowed to vote.

Post-election violence
The election sparked riots in Northern Nigeria. According to Human Rights Watch about 140 were killed in political violence before the election alone, between November 2010 until 17 April 2011, the day after the election. According to the head of a leading Nigerian civil rights group living in Kaduna, more than 500 mostly Muslim people had been killed in three villages just in Kaduna since 16 April 2011. A speaker for the "Open Society Justice Initiative" stated the only comparable episodes of violence occurred in the mid-1960s and early 1980s, which both led to government overthrow. Buhari had refused to condemn possible violent reaction to the election result, which has been interpreted as an invitation to his supporters to riot. Up to 1,000 people could have died in post-election violence.

Further reading
John A. Ayoade, and Adeoye A. Akinsanya, eds. Nigeria's Critical Election, 2011 (Lexington Books; 2012)

References

Presidential elections in Nigeria
Nigeria
Pres
Nigerian presidential election